The death of Chavis Carter occurred on July 29, 2012. Carter, a 21-year-old Black American man, was found dead from a gunshot while handcuffed in the back of a police patrol car. His death was ruled a suicide by the Arkansas State Crime Lab.

Carter was in the passenger seat of a pickup truck which was stopped by the Jonesboro Police Department of Jonesboro, Arkansas. It was reported that an officer found small amounts of cannabis on his person after a body search and ran his information through the police computer network. The officers discovered that he had an outstanding warrant, so they placed him under arrest, searching him again and handcuffing his hands behind his back before placing him in the patrol vehicle.

Minutes later, the officers discovered that Chavis Carter was shot in the head. The officers found a semi-automatic, .380-caliber Cobra pistol near the body. The Jonesboro Police Department believe that he had hidden the gun on his person that the officers did not detect through the two searches and used it on himself. Carter's mother disagreed, claiming that Carter had no history of suicidal thoughts or actions, and addressed the fact that he had made arrangements with his girlfriend to meet him at the prison the next day, and that the police killed him. In addition, she states that he was left-handed and was handcuffed behind his back, yet the bullet entered through his right temple. The two officers at the scene were placed on administrative leave and an investigation was started.

A video was released by the police in which a police officer of similar height and build to Carter shows how Carter could have shot himself while handcuffed in a police car. A witness to the event said the police were outside the vehicle when the shot was fired.

The FBI were requested by the Jonesboro Police Department to investigate the death.

The local NAACP sponsored a vigil. There have been several protests in Jonesboro due to many not believing the police explanation of Carter's death.

On August 20, 2012, the Arkansas crime lab ruled the death as a suicide.

Similar deaths
Jesus Huerta, in Durham, North Carolina in 2013, and Victor White III, in Louisiana in 2014, both died under similar circumstances.

References

Suicides by firearm in Arkansas
2012 deaths
Deaths in police custody in the United States
Deaths by person in Arkansas
Jonesboro, Arkansas
2012 in Arkansas